Budyonnovets (Budennovsı) is a rural locality (a village) in Mikhaylovsky Selsoviet, Bakalinsky District, Bashkortostan, Russia. The population was 71 as of 2010. There is 1 street.

Geography 
Budyonnovets is located 22 km south of Bakaly (the district's administrative centre) by road. Mikhaylovka is the nearest rural locality.

References 

Rural localities in Bakalinsky District